West Australian Football League (WAFL) club  has a relationship with the VFL/AFL dating back to the start of the 20th century, with numerous players moving in both directions to and from Victoria and Western Australia. To cover for two-way movement, a separate list is provided for players who moved to Subiaco from the VFL/AFL. Only footballers who have played at least one senior game at VFL/AFL are included.

Players recruited / drafted into VFL/AFL from Subiaco

There is a list of past and present Subiaco players who have played at AFL/VFL:

Richard Ambrose (Sydney Swans) (1993)
Jack Anthony (Collingwood and Fremantle) (2008–2012)
David Antonowicz (West Coast Eagles) (2000)
Horrie Bant (1882–1957) (St Kilda and Essendon) (1906–1910)
Dave Barry (1888–1913) (South Melbourne) (1909–1910)
Peter Bird (Fitzroy) (1995–1996)
John Bowe (1911–1990) (South Melbourne) (1933)
Todd Breman (West Coast Eagles and Richmond) (1989–1993)
Peter Bennett (Hawthorn and Essendon) (1976-1981)
Greg Broughton (Fremantle and Gold Coast) (2009–2015)
Jay Burton (Fremantle) (1995)
Bill Bushell (1888–1951) (St Kilda) (1910)
Ted Cahill (1902–1968) (Footscray) (1927-1928)
Brad C. Campbell (St Kilda) (1997–1999)
Bruce Campbell (1890–1964) (Carlton, Fitzroy and Melbourne) (1911–1912; 1920)
Adam Cockie (West Coast Eagles) (2008–2009)
Davitt Coghlan (Fitzroy) (1925, 1928-1930)
Matthew Connell (West Coast Eagles and Adelaide) (1993–2000)
Brian Cook (Melbourne) (1977)
Jack Cooper (1922–2003) (Carlton) (1947)
Lou Daily (1911–1974) (Collingwood and Geelong) (1933–1934)
Ian Dargie (St Kilda and West Coast Eagles) (1989–1991)
Col Davey (1927–2013) (Collingwood) (1951–1952)
Rochford Devenish-Meares (Hawthorn) (1968)
Ernie Eiffler (1925–2014) (Collingwood) (1945)
Doug Fraser (1886–1919) (Carlton) (1910)
Michael R. Gardiner (Collingwood) (1998–1999)
Nick Gelavis (South Melbourne and Footscray) (1953–1954)
John Georgiades (Footscray) (1989–1991)
Tim Gepp (Richmond and Footscray) (1983–1986)
Tony Godden (West Coast Eagles and Fremantle) (1993–1998)
David Gourdis (Richmond) (2010–2011)
Chris Hall (Port Adelaide) (2003)
Damian Hampson (West Coast Eagles) (1993–1994)

Kyron Hayden (North Melbourne) (2018-Current)
David Haynes (West Coast Eagles and Geelong (2000–2005)
Graham Heal (North Melbourne) (1968)
Jason Heatley (West Coast Eagles and St Kilda) (1995–2000)
Evan Hewitt (North Melbourne and Adelaide) (1997–2002)
Todd Holmes (West Coast Eagles) (1998–2000)
Bret Hutchinson (Melbourne) (1985)
Ron Jacks (Footscray) (1973)
Jarrhan Jacky (Adelaide) (2008)
Bob Johnson (1935–2001) (Melbourne) (1954–1961)
Jarrod Kayler-Thomson (Hawthorn) (2010)
Adam Lange (Kangaroos) (1999–2002)
Johnny Leonard (1903–1995) (South Melbourne) (1932)
Andrew Macnish (West Coast Eagles and Geelong) (1987–1992)
Neil Marshall (West Coast Eagles) (1997–1998)
Sam McFarlane (North Melbourne) (1996)
Paul McDonald (Essendon) (1975–1978)
Daniel Metropolis (West Coast Eagles and Fremantle) (1992–2001)
Harry Morgan (1889–1956) (South Melbourne and Carlton) (1914–1915; 1917–1918; 1921)
George Moysey (1874–1932) (Melbourne) (1897–1899)
David Mundy (Fremantle) (2005–present)
John O'Connell (1951–1989) (Carlton) (1970–1976)
Glenn O'Loughlin (West Coast Eagles) (1987)
Billy Orr (1883–1963) (Carlton) (1903)
Daniel Parker (Fremantle) (1996–1999)
Seff Parry (1907–1980) (Fitzroy) (1933)
Stan Penberthy (1906–1989) (Footscray and Melbourne) (1932–1937)
Todd Ridley (Essendon, Fremantle and Hawthorn) (1991–1997)
Michael Rix (St Kilda) (2006–2008)
Lester Ross (St Kilda) (1959)
Eric Sarich (South Melbourne) (1965-1968; 1971)
Joe Scaddan (1886–1971) (Collingwood) (1910)
Phil Scott (West Coast Eagles) (1987–1990)
David Sierakowski (St Kilda and West Coast) (1994–2003)
Callum Sinclair (West Coast Eagles and Sydney Swans) (2013–present)
Peter Spencer (North Melbourne) (1981–1982)
Lance Styles (Carlton) (1973–1974)
Jack Sweet (1919–2006) (South Melbourne) (1943)
Michael Taylor (Fremantle) (1995)
Robert Thompson (Essendon) (1967–1971)
Wayde Twomey (Carlton) (2011)
Bill Valli (Collingwood and Essendon) (1979–1980)
Cameron Venables (Collingwood) (1999)
Shane Yarran (Fremantle) (2016)
Mark Zanotti (West Coast Eagles, Brisbane Bears and Fitzroy) (1987–1995)

Players who came to Subiaco from the VFL/AFL
 Frank Murphy, from Collingwood (1935–1937: 53 games, 11 goals)
 Haydn Bunton Sr., from Fitzroy (1938–1941: 72 games, 190 goals — 3× Sandover Medal 1938, 1939, 1941)
Les Hardiman, from Geelong (1938–1941: 69 games, 122 goals)
Keith Shea from Carlton (1938–1939: 37 games, 69 goals)
Dave Cuzens, from Richmond (1962: 13 games, 8 goals)
 Brian Sierakowski, from St Kilda (1969–1974: 115 games, 20 goals — WANFL Premiership 1973)
 Peter Ellis, from Fitzroy (1972, 1974–78: 88 games, 63 goals)
 Ross Smith, from St Kilda (1973–1974: 39 games, 22 goals — WANFL Premiership captain-coach 1973)
David Rhodes, from Fitzroy (1974–1977: 48 games, 33 goals)
 David Parkin, from Hawthorn (1975: 8 games, 2 goals)
Graeme Schultz, from Essendon (1975–1981: 85 games, 137 goals)
 Vin Catoggio, from Carlton (1976–1977: 30 games, 53 goals)
 Brian Douge, from Hawthorn (1977–1981: 81 games, 23 goals)
 Derek Kickett, from Sydney (1997: 12 games, 29 goals)
 Daniel Chick, from West Coast (2008–2009: 22 games, 13 goals — WAFL Premiership 2008) [originally from East Fremantle]

West Coast representatives
 Laurie Keene, 1987–1990: 36 games, 38 goals — Kicked West Coast's first VFL/AFL goal
 Dwayne Lamb, 1987–1994: 151 games, 44 goals — AFL Premiership 1992
 Mark Zanotti, 1987–1988: 36 games, 6 goals
 Karl Langdon, 1988–1995: 100 games, 107 goals — AFL Premiership 1992
 Brett Heady, 1990–1999: 156 games, 237 goals — 2× AFL Premiership (1992, 1994)
 Dean Kemp, 1990–2001: 243 games, 117 goals — 2× AFL Premiership (1992, 1994), Norm Smith Medal 1994, All-Australian 1992
 Drew Banfield, 1993–2006: 265 games, 76 goals — 2× AFL Premiership (1994, 2006)
 Jarrad Schofield 1993–1998: 63 games, 34 goals
 Andrew Donnelly, 1996–2000: 68 games, 69 goals
 Josh Wooden, 1997–2007: 96 games, 18 goals
 Chad Fletcher, 1999–2009: 179 games, 74 goals — AFL Premiership 2006, All-Australian 2004
 Mark Nicoski, 2004–2013: 112 games, 61 goals
 Tyson Stenglein, 2005–2009: 102 games, 25 goals — AFL Premiership 2006
 Matt Priddis, 2006–2017: 240 games, 73 goals — Brownlow Medal 2014, All-Australian 2015
 Dom Sheed, 2014–current: 141 games, 64 goals — AFL Premiership 2018
 Brayden Ainsworth, 2018–current: 15 games, 4 goals
 Liam Ryan, 2018–current: 77 games, 111 goals — AFL Premiership 2018, All-Australian 2020

Fremantle representatives
 Matthew Burton, 1995–1999: 70 games, 32 goals 
 Shane Parker, 1995–2007: 238 games, 11 goals — First player to reach 200 AFL games for Fremantle 
 Luke Toia, 1996–2003: 63 games, 33 goals
 Antoni Grover, 1999–2012: 202 games, 27 goals
 Ryan Crowley, 2003–2015: 188 games, 117 goals
 Des Headland, 2003–2010: 114 games, 125 goals
 Jarrad Schofield, 2005–2006: 12 games, 2 goals

Subiaco Football Club players